Antipodogomphus dentosus is a species of dragonfly of the family Gomphidae, 
commonly known as the Top End dragon. 
It is endemic to Northern Territory, Australia, where it has been found in rivers.

Antipodogomphus dentosus is a small to medium-sized black and yellow dragonfly with a long tail.

Gallery

See also
 List of Odonata species of Australia

References

Gomphidae
Odonata of Australia
Endemic fauna of Australia
Taxa named by J.A.L. (Tony) Watson
Insects described in 1991